Thamnophis lineri, known commonly as Liner's garter snake, is a species of snake in the family Colubridae. The species is endemic to Mexico.

Etymology
The specific name lineri is in honor of the American herpetologist Ernest A. Liner (1925–2010).

Geographic range
T. lineri is found only in the Mexican state of Oaxaca.

Habitat

Reproduction
T. lineri is viviparous.

References

Further reading
Heimes, Peter (2016). Snakes of Mexico: Herpetofauna Mexicana Vol I. Frankfurt, Germany: Chimaira. 572 pp. .
Rossman, Douglas A.; Burbrink, Frank T. (2005). "Species limits within the Mexican garter snakes of the Thamnophis godmani complex". Occasional Papers of the Museum of Natural Science, Louisiana State University (79): 1-43. (Thamnophis lineri, new species, pp. 25–29, Figures 10–11).

lineri
Reptiles described in 2005
Reptiles of Mexico
Taxa named by Douglas A. Rossman